Serhiy Dmytrovych Chenbay (born 6 November 1992) is a Ukrainian professional footballer who plays as a midfielder for Inhulets Petrove in the Ukrainian Premier League.

Career
He is a product of the Atlet Kyiv academy. 

In February 2012 signed a one-year contract with FC Vorskla Poltava. He made his debut in the Ukrainian Premier League against Metalist Kharkiv on 10 May 2012.

References

External links 
 
 

1992 births
Living people
Footballers from Kyiv
Ukrainian footballers
Association football midfielders
FC Vorskla Poltava players
FC Kremin Kremenchuk players
FC Hirnyk-Sport Horishni Plavni players
FC Metalist 1925 Kharkiv players
FC Inhulets Petrove players
Ukrainian Premier League players
Ukrainian First League players
Ukrainian Second League players